The Army Combat Shirt (ACS) is a flame-resistant shirt developed and used by the United States Army as a supplementary addition to the Army Combat Uniform. The ACS is a stand-alone shirt designed specifically for use with Improved Outer Tactical Vest armor in warm and hot weather instead of the blouse. It is intended to greatly increase user comfort through the use of lightweight, moisture-wicking, and breathable fabrics. The ACS was created in conjunction with the USMC's Flame Resistant Organizational Gear (FROG). The ACS, in conjunction with the Fire Resistant ACU (FRACU) trousers, provides head-to-toe protection against burns.

Background
Traditionally, flame-resistant uniforms have been reserved for military personnel such as aviators, fuel handlers and combat vehicle crew who were most likely to encounter fuel-related fires. However, the increasing frequency of improvised explosive devices in Afghanistan and Iraq during the 2000s greatly increased the number of troops in need of flame-resistant clothing and uniforms.

History

2000s

2002–2006: Development
Early prototype versions of the Army Combat Shirt were unveiled by the Army in May 2002 as part of the Objective Force Warrior program. Updated prototypes in the MultiCam camouflage pattern were displayed in July 2004 at a military technology convention held at the U.S. Capitol as a part of the Future Force Warrior program. 

A year later in June 2005, prototypes were again displayed during a Future Force Warrior convention at the U.S. Capitol.

2007: Introduction
In January 2007, the Army began shipping 160,000 flame-resistant Nomex uniforms for soldiers assigned to at-risk convoy operations. However, the Nomex uniforms restricted air movement more than the traditional Cotton/Nylon ACU and were hotter for soldiers to wear. Army equipment officials developed the ACS to provide soldiers with a lightweight, breathable alternative to the Nomex ACU.

2010s

2016–2019: Ballistic Combat Shirt
Currently the U.S. Army is working on an armored variant of the Army Combat Shirt known as the "Ballistic Combat Shirt", which adds ballistic protection to the upper thorax, lower neck, and upper sleeve areas while sacrificing as little arm mobility as possible. This has been desirable due to the increasing prevalence of low-profile body armor which does not support the additional extremity protection the IBA system does, as well as ergonomic issues with the extremity protection that causes soldiers to choose not to use them even when wearing compatible armor. It will begin fielding in 2019.

Overview
Initially, the torso of the shirt was foliage green with the Army Strong logo centered on the chest (removed in later versions); the arms are in the Universal Camouflage Pattern similar to the Army Combat Uniform, with integrated anti-abrasion elbow pads. No-seam shoulders minimize rubbing or chafing against armor. With the adoption of the MultiCam uniform for wear in Afghanistan, there is now a version made with a coyote brown body (Tan 498) and MultiCam sleeves.  When the US Army adopted the Operational Camouflage Pattern starting in 2015, a third variant became available which complies to the US Army uniform regulations code AR 670-1 (Wear and Appearance of Army Uniform and Insignia) with a tan/green body (Tan 499) and sleeves in the OCP pattern. Other features include a double pen pocket on the lower arm, zippered storage pockets on the upper arm, concealable infrared identification tabs, and a place to attach name, rank, and flag on the upper arm. There are two styles of the ACS available for soldiers.  The Type I has a mock turtle neck and the Type II has a Mandarin style collar with a 3/4 zipper on the chest/neck.  The features of all three shirts, besides the collar differences from the two types, are all the same.

The ACS is constructed of three flame-resistant performance fabrics proprietary to TenCate Protective Fabrics or Massif Mountain Gear Company. The shirt’s torso is constructed of two highly breathable flame-resistant fabrics with advanced moisture management capabilities. Both fabrics wick moisture away from the skin and dry rapidly, preventing the fabrics from sticking to the user’s skin and greatly increasing comfort under body armor. The sleeves and side panels of the shirt are constructed of a lightweight, but durable and abrasion-resistant fabric designed to provide extra protection for areas not protected by body armor. All three fabrics feature 4-way stretch for enhanced performance and user comfort.

See also
Airman Battle Uniform
Interceptor Body Armor

References

Further reading
PEO Soldier to Unveil New Army Combat Shirt by Debi Dawson, 4 May 2007
New Fireproof Army Shirt More Breathable by Matthew Cox, 19 September 2007
Matthew Cox, "Stopping the Burn", Army Times (7 May 2007)

External links

Army Combat Shirt Factsheet
Massif
Program Executive Office Soldier

Army Combat Shirt
Army Combat Shirt
2007 clothing
Military equipment introduced in the 2000s